Lleshi is an Albanian surname. Notable people with this name include:
 Anton Lleshi (born 1993), Albanian footballer
 Bleri Lleshi (born 1981), Albanian philosopher, researcher and activist
 Haxhi Lleshi (1913–1998), Albanian military leader and communist politician
 Ismail Lleshi (born 1947), Albanian politician
 Mustafa Lleshi, Albanian anti-fascist
 Shefki Riza Lleshi, (1912-2001) Albanian patriot

References

Albanian-language surnames